Karl-Heinz Wozniak is an East German retired slalom canoeist who competed in the 1950s and the 1960s. He won six medals at the ICF Canoe Slalom World Championships with a gold (C-1 team: 1963), three silvers (C-1 team: 1955, 1959, 1961) and two bronzes (C-1: 1955, 1959).

References

German male canoeists
Possibly living people
Year of birth missing
Medalists at the ICF Canoe Slalom World Championships